Richard Scorer is a Principal Lawyer in Slater and Gordon Lawyers in Manchester where he is Head of Abuse Law.  He was formerly Head of Serious Injury at Pannone LLP.

He has represented abuse victims in cases against local authorities, schools and churches. He acted for some of the victims of John Worboys.  He acted for some of the victims of John Smyth in their claim against the Titus Trust.

Independent Inquiry into Child Sexual Abuse
He represented 68 victims and survivors of abuse before the Independent Inquiry into Child Sexual Abuse. including former pupils of Downside School, Ampleforth College and Chetham's School of Music, and victims of the late Cyril Smith MP.

In 2018 he called for Richard Farnell, the former leader of Rochdale Council to be prosecuted for perjury when he was found to have lied under oath to the inquiry.  He said that staff attitudes in the council had improved but that Rochdale political culture was still stuck in a backwards time warp and remained in desperate need of reform.

He has written extensively about the work of the inquiry for the National Secular Society, of which he is vice-president.

David Steel was suspended from his membership of the Liberal Democrat Party in 2019 after he admitted to the inquiry that he had known about Cyril Smith's child abuse.  Scorer said “His failure to stop Smith in 1979, allowing him to go on and abuse more young boys, is inexcusable and he must be held to account." He called for him to be stripped of his peerage.

Church of England
He criticised the Church of England saying that it had orchestrated years of institutional cover-up and denial and could not be trusted to put its own house in order.  It had created a perfect environment in which abusers could flourish.  He called for an independent body to be set up which could investigate allegations of abuse and override bishops who were unwilling to comply with their responsibilities.  He said that Bishop Peter Ball had found his fellow bishops to be the “perfect accomplices, prepared to turn a blind eye to his abuse over many decades”.

Safeguarding boards
He criticised proposals to dispense with local safeguarding children’s boards in the Children and Social Work Bill, because there would be no statutory obligation to involve all the relevant agencies.

References

21st-century English lawyers
Child sexual abuse in the United Kingdom
Year of birth missing (living people)
Living people